The International University of Scholars Or University Of Scholars, also known as IUS) is a private university based in Dhaka,  Bangladesh.

History 
The International University of Scholars, was established in 2015 at Badda with five departments. The government provided permission to the university on 11 January 2016; the request was filled by Jamil Habib. According to the New Age report on 4 August 2022 the university only had only one full professor.

Administration

List of Vice-chancellor 

 Professor  Dr. Abdus Sattar,  1st March 2019- 28th February 2023
 Professor  Dr. Mamunur Rashid ( acting) 1st March 2023- present

Trustee Board

Academic departments 
There are three faculty and  six departments of this university.

Faculty of Business studies 

 Department of Business Administration

Faculty of Humanities and Social sciences 

 Department of English

Faculty of  Science and Technology 
 Department of Computer Science and Engineering
 Department of Electrical and Electronics Engineering
 Department of Textile Engineering
 Department of Natural Science

References 

2015 establishments in Bangladesh
Universities and colleges in Dhaka
Educational institutions established in 2015
Private universities in Bangladesh